The 2011 Heluva Good! Sour Cream Dips at The Glen is a NASCAR Sprint Cup Series stock car race held on August 15, 2011 at Watkins Glen International in Watkins Glen, New York. Contested over 90 laps, it was the 22nd race of the 2011 season. It was scheduled to be run on August 14, 2011 but was postponed to Monday because of rain. The race was won by Marcos Ambrose of Richard Petty Motorsports, his first career victory in the Cup series and also the first-ever Cup win by an Australian driver. Brad Keselowski finished second and Kyle Busch finished third.

Race report

Background

Watkins Glen International is one of two road courses to hold NASCAR races, the other being Infineon Raceway.

Before the race, Carl Edwards was leading the Drivers' Championship with 720 points, and Jimmie Johnson stood in second with 711 points. Kyle Busch and Kurt Busch followed in third and fourth with 709 and 706 points, six ahead of Kevin Harvick and 38 ahead Jeff Gordon in fifth and sixth. Ryan Newman with 658 was 16 points ahead of Tony Stewart and 19 ahead of Dale Earnhardt Jr. In the Manufacturers' Championship, Chevrolet was first with 140 points, 21 ahead of Ford, and 26 ahead of Toyota. Dodge was placed fourth with 89 points. Juan Pablo Montoya is the race's defending winner from 2010.

Practice and qualifying

Race
Kyle Busch began leading, but when they entered turn 1 of the last two laps, he turned too far and immediately in second place Brad Keselowski and Marcos Ambrose in third place passed him. Keselowski lead until Marcos Ambrose quickly took the lead in the Inner Loop. Ambrose continued to lead when a major crash occurred at turn 2 in the final lap involving Boris Said, David Ragan, David Reutimann and few other cars that saw Reutimann go airborne and end up on his roof. This accident did not bring out the caution flag, but was brought out soon after when Tony Stewart spun out of control at the Inner Loop and Ambrose won the race.

Results

Qualifying

Race results

Standings after the race

Drivers' Championship standings

References

Heluva Good! Sour Cream Dips at the Glen
Heluva Good! Sour Cream Dips at the Glen
NASCAR races at Watkins Glen International
August 2011 sports events in the United States